Velvet bean is a common name for several legumes and may refer to:
Mucuna pruriens and its subspecies Mucuna deeringiana
Pseudarthria hookeri